Jack Mack (14 March 1881 – 9 June 1960) was an Australian rules footballer who played with Port Adelaide in the South Australian National Football League (SANFL).

A follower, Mack made his debut for Port Adelaide in 1900 and played with the club until 1906 when he spent a season with Central Broken Hill. In 1907 he returned to Port Adelaide and won that year's Magarey Medal. That season he also represented South Australia at interstate football for the first time. He was part of his state's inaugural carnival team at Melbourne in 1908 and retired from the game after the 1909 season.

See also
 1908 Melbourne Carnival

Footnotes

References

1881 births
1960 deaths
Port Adelaide Football Club (SANFL) players
Port Adelaide Football Club players (all competitions)
Magarey Medal winners
Australian rules footballers from South Australia